Circus peanuts are American peanut-shaped marshmallow candy. They date to the 19th century, when they were one of a large variety of unwrapped "penny candy" sold in such retail outlets as five-and-dime stores.

As of the 2010s, the most familiar variety of mass-produced circus peanuts is orange-colored and flavored with an artificial banana flavor. These are typically made from sugar, corn syrup, gelatin, pectin, soy protein, food coloring and artificial flavor. Confectioners originally distributed an orange-flavored variety that was only available seasonally due to a lack of packaging capable of preserving the candy. In the spring, five-and-dimes sold circus peanuts as penny candy. In the 1940s, circus peanuts became one of the many candies to become available year-round owing to the industrial proliferation of cellophane packaging.

Over the years, confectioners have also offered circus peanuts colored yellow, pink, and white, including a variety of flavors, though orange is still the most predominant color and banana the most common flavor. The leading producers of circus peanuts are Melster Candies, Spangler Candy Company and Brach's, although the products are essentially identical. The Publix supermarket chain at one time sold generic circus peanuts under its own label, manufactured by Farley and Sathers.

Circus peanuts led to the creation of Lucky Charms in 1964 when a General Mills employee chopped pieces into a bowl of Cheerios.

References

External links

Confectionery
Peanuts
Marshmallows